The list of National Nature Reserves of France presents the list of National Nature Reserves, in French Réserves Naturelles Nationales, (RNN) located on French territory.

Since the law on local democracy of 2002, the six former RNN 24, 51, 85, 120, 147 and 151, located in Corsica, are now known as "Corsican Nature Reserves", in French Réserves naturelles de Corse, (RNC).

The oldest French RNN is that of Lake Luitel, established in 1961.

According to the INSEE, a nature reserve is a part of the territory where fauna, flora, soil, waters, mineral and fossil deposits and, in general, the environment tof particular importance are protected. This territory should be protected from any artificial intervention likely to degrade it.

On February 1, 2020, 167 national natural reserves exists in France

List of national natural reserves

Downgraded National Nature Reserves 
The following nature reserves have been downgraded (or will be downgraded for Chalmessin) as a result of their integration into other protected areas.

References 

Nature reserves in France